Ricardo Mohammed (born 26 May 1978) is a Guyanese cricketer. He played in one first-class and four List A matches for Guyana from 1998 to 2001.

See also
 List of Guyanese representative cricketers

References

External links
 

1978 births
Living people
Guyanese cricketers
Guyana cricketers